Jacques-Alexandre Laffon de Ladebat (2 January 1719 – 18 November 1797) was a prominent shipbuilder and merchant of the port of Bordeaux in the late 18th century. His son, André-Daniel Laffon de Ladebat (November 30th, 1746 – October 14th 1829), succeeded him, and later became involved in politics. In 1789 he participated in the French Revolution. 

Born on January 2nd, 1719, to Daniel Laffon de Ladébat and Jeanne Nairac, his family, being Protestant, had fled to the Netherlands following revocation of the Edict of Nantes (1685). Following the death of Louis XIV, religious persecution became less severe, and religious attitudes in France became more tolerant. As a result, in 1744, Ladébat was able to return to France. There, he and his brother created a successful business as wine merchants and maritime traders through the network of correspondents that they had developed in the Netherlands.

In 1755, Ladébat began to trade in the colonies of the French West Indies and, from 1764, this included the slave trade. In 1769, no longer content to trade in naval weapons and wine, he created a sugar plantation in the French colony of Saint-Domingue, and began clearing and cultivating land in Bordeaux by buying several hundred acres straddling Pessac and Merignac. He built a model farm called "Bellevue," which produced grain, flour, wine, lumber, silkworms and trained farm hands.

All these economic activities earned him acclaim, and he was ennobled and granted a coat-of-arms in 1773, despite his Protestant faith. His grant of arms symbolized his areas of success: "Azure, a gushing fountain of money surmounted by a golden sun with two anchors." The motto "Soyez Utile" accompanied the arms.

External links
Ladebat site by one of his descendants

1719 births
1797 deaths
Businesspeople from Bordeaux
People of Saint-Domingue
18th-century French businesspeople
French slave traders